Punpun is a satellite town in the Patna Metropolitan Region, Patna district, in the Indian state of Bihar.

Geography 
It is located 10 km south of Patna. The name Punpun comes from the nearby Punpun River, a tributary of the Ganges River, on whose bank the village has flourished. Many towns such as Sigori are located on the banks of the river.

17.6 square kilometers in Dumri Village, in the Punpun block of Patna (PMR), have been allocated for an Information Technology Park. Punpun railway station is connected by rail and Road (SH 78), (NH 83).

History 

Mata Seeta (Mother Seeta) spent time near Punpun village. Pind Daan Gaya and Punpun are the most important and auspicious places in Hindu Dharma. Every year, Hindus from Nepal and India go there to observe Śrāddha, or Pind Daan. The first Pind Daan was done in Punpun.

Education 
In Punpun, the S.M.D. College and Subodh Kumar Mahila College provide education up until the post-graduate level. A 10+2 level government school for boys and girls is present.

Economy 
The organizations of AIIMS and IITP are located within 10 kilometers.

Punpun is developing into a business hub, as many small companies invested in the area.  Punpun has a thriving scene of self-employment cooperatives with communities that provide jobs.

Alawalpur (Punpun) village plans a co-operative milk union to promote dairy products in Patna.

Sports 

Many different high school campus grounds, along with the Gandhi Maidan historical site and S.M.D. College grounds, serve as playgrounds. Cricket is popular.

Gallery

References

External links

Cities and towns in Patna district
Populated places on the Punpun River